Stress cracking may refer to:

Environmental stress cracking
Stress corrosion cracking
Sulfide stress cracking